The Karenggapa are an Aboriginal Australian people of New South Wales.

Country
They took in Tibooburra, at Yalpunga and Connulpie Downs, and included the Bulloo Lakes area. Their southwestern boundaries lay in the vicinity of Milparinka, while their eastern frontier ran along Therloo Downs.

Social organisation and rites
The Karenggapa did not practice subincision, their initiation rites involving only circumcision.

Language
They may have spoken a Yarli dialect. AUSTLANG has not given a confirmed status to a language of this name, saying that its identity is unclear; it may be either an alternative name or dialect of the Wangkumara language.

Alternative names
 Karengappa
 Karrengappa
 Kurengappa

Source:

Notes

Citations

Sources

Indigenous Australians in New South Wales